The 1987 NCAA Women's Division I Swimming and Diving Championships were contested at the sixth annual NCAA-sanctioned swim meet to determine the team and individual national champions of Division I women's collegiate swimming and diving in the United States. 

This year's events were hosted by Indiana University at the Indiana University Natatorium in Indianapolis, Indiana. 

Texas again topped the team standings, finishing just 17 points ahead of Stanford; it was the Longhorns' fourth consecutive and fourth overall women's team title.

Team standings
Note: Top 10 only
(H) = Hosts
(DC) = Defending champions
Full results

See also
List of college swimming and diving teams

References

NCAA Division I Swimming And Diving Championships
NCAA Division I Swimming And Diving Championships
NCAA Division I Women's Swimming and Diving Championships